Johan Jordi Cruijff (anglicised to Cruyff; born 9 February 1974) is a football coach and former player. He is the son of former player and manager Johan Cruyff. 

As a footballer, Cruyff played from 1992 through to 2010, including periods with Barcelona and Manchester United. He earned nine caps for the Netherlands national team, playing at UEFA Euro 1996, and he won the Premier League title in 1997 while at Manchester United.

Cruyff played mainly as an attacking midfielder, although he could also perform as a second striker. In his later years, notably with Metalurh Donetsk, he also played as a centre back. After starting his career with Barcelona and playing for the Netherlands aged 22, Cruyff's career stalled while at Manchester United, as he appeared just 36 times in the league over four years largely because of injuries. His most successful period was arguably with Deportivo Alavés, which he led to the 2001 UEFA Cup Final. He also played for Celta Vigo, RCD Espanyol and finished his playing career with Valletta in the Maltese Premier League.

Under his stewardship as Maccabi Tel Aviv's sporting director, the club regained its dominance in Israeli football. The team won consecutive league titles from 2012 to 2015, as well as regularly qualifying for the Europa League and Champions League.

Club career

Barcelona

In 1992, Cruyff made his debut for FC Barcelona B in the Segunda División, becoming the team's top scorer alongside Óscar. Two years later, Cruyff was promoted to the senior team during a pre-season tour in the Netherlands, where he scored hat-tricks against Groningen and De Graafschap. On 4 September 1994, he made his top flight debut in a 2–1 defeat at Sporting Gijón. On 2 November, he played against Manchester United in the Champions League, setting up the first goal for Hristo Stoichkov, as Barcelona won 4–0.

That season, Barcelona finished fourth in La Liga and Cruyff was one of the team's top scorers alongside Stoichkov and Koeman, despite not being a regular starter. Cruyff scored the goal that guaranteed Barcelona played in Europe the following season.

Despite a positive start to the following campaign, Barcelona finished 3rd and were runners up in the Copa del Rey. On 19 May 1996, he played his last game for the club against Celta Vigo, at the Camp Nou.

Manchester United
In August 1996, Cruyff signed with Manchester United for a fee of £1.4 million on a four-year contract. He made his debut on 11 August in a 4–0 win over Newcastle United in the 1996 FA Charity Shield, and then played in a 3–0 win over Wimbledon, the opening league fixture of the 1996–97 FA Premier League. Cruyff then scored on his next two appearances, helping the team to 2–2 draws against Everton and Blackburn Rovers.

He was a regular in the first team until the end of November 1996, when he suffered another knee injury. Cruyff's spell at Manchester United was marked by injuries, but he played three games in the group stage of the 1998–99 UEFA Champions League. He played eleven times and scored twice in 1998–99 season before a loan deal with Celta Vigo took him back to Spain in January 1999 and thus denying him the chance to win the treble achieved by the club in May 1999. He scored twice in eight games for the Spaniards before returning for United.

Cruyff's contract expired on 30 June 2000. In four years he had played a total of 57 games for United and scored eight goals.

Return to La Liga
After an initial agreement with Harry Redknapp's West Ham United fell through, Cruyff returned to Spain on a free transfer to Alavés. With the Basque club, he reached the 2001 UEFA Cup Final, against Liverpool: despite being 2–0 and then 3–1 down, Alavés embarked on a spirited comeback and Cruyff's goal in the 89th minute tied the game at 4–4. An own goal in extra time saw Liverpool lift the cup.
Cruyff continued to play for Alavés until the club was relegated at the end of 2002–03.

The following season, he joined Espanyol, being played regularly in his only season. Cruyff decided against extending his contract with Espanyol and voluntarily left that summer.

Later career
He then trained with Bolton Wanderers, coached by Sam Allardyce, but failed a medical test. After he temporarily retired in 2004, Cruyff made a return to professional football in 2006, playing two seasons at the Ukrainian side Metalurh Donetsk, where he played mainly as a centre back. At the same time, he entered the fashion business, helping develop the Cruyff clothing brand.

In mid-2009, Cruyff signed a three-year deal as a player-cum-assistant-manager of Maltese side Valletta, assisting first team coach Ton Caanen, a role he admitted he did not take to. He made his debut on 26 July 2009, in a 3–0 win in the Europa League 2009–10 first qualifying round against Icelandic side Keflavík. His first league appearance came on 21 August 2008, in a 3–1 win over Birkirkara. He scored his first goal on 29 August 2009 in a 6–0 win against Floriana. Valletta won the MFA Trophy in Cruyff's first season beating Qormi 2–1, although Cruyff did not play in the final as he was not fully fit.

Despite mostly playing as a defensive player in the latter stages of his career, Cruyff took on a more attacking role with Valletta.

International career

Cruyff was approached by both countries, Spain and the Netherlands, when he was eligible to play for their under-21 teams. He was unsure which country to represent, and in 1996 he declined the possibility to join the Spanish team for the Olympic Games, opting instead to play for the Netherlands at Euro '96. His performances for Barcelona persuaded coach Guus Hiddink to include him in the Netherlands squad for the tournament. He made his debut for the national side in a 2–0 friendly defeat against Germany on 24 April 1996. Cruyff scored his only goal for the Netherlands during a 2–0 win against Switzerland at Villa Park on 13 June, and was one of five Dutch footballers to be selected for the Dutch national team while never having played in the Eredivisie.

Career as sports director

AEK Larnaca
In 2010, Cruyff announced his retirement from professional football and joined AEK Larnaca as director of football on a three-year deal. He appointed Ton Caanen as head coach, and the pair worked to establish the team as a new football powerhouse in Cyprus. In his first season, the team finished 4th and the team qualified for the UEFA Europa League. In his second season, AEK Larnaca qualified for the groups stage of the Europa League after beating Rosenborg in the play-offs.

The participation of the team in the 2011–12 UEFA Europa League was historic for both the club and for Cyprus football, as the club became the first Cypriot team to secure qualification to the Europa League (preceded by Anorthosis and APOEL in the group stages of the Champions League). The team finished 5th that season in the domestic league.

Maccabi Tel Aviv
In April 2012, Cruyff was appointed by Mitchell Goldhar, owner of Maccabi Tel Aviv, as the Sports Director of the football club paying compensation to AEK Larnaca. His initial work included signing Óscar, then head coach of FC Barcelona Juvenil A, as head coach of the club.

Cruyff's arrival finally put an end to Maccabi Tel Aviv's bad fortunes in the league as they won their first championship in ten years. Under Cruyff's and Garcia's stewardship, Maccabi dominated the league and claimed the title by thirteen points ahead of their nearest rival. The team finished the season as the league's highest scorers, with 78, whilst only conceding 30 - the fewest in the league.

The 2013–14 season saw a change in the club's coach position, when Cruyff appointed the Portuguese coach, Paulo Sousa to replace Garcia, after the Spanish coach was signed by English Championship side Brighton and Hove Albion. During this period, many players left the club whilst several others were recruited.

The team continued its success in the league competition by claiming another league title by a margin of 16 points. The club also enjoyed success in the Europa League as they advanced to the round of 32 following a difficult group stage, where they beat Bordeaux (twice) and Eintracht Frankfurt before eventually exiting the competition following a loss to FC Basel.

The 2014–15 season was characterized by a difficult start. Operation Protective Edge meant that the qualifying games to the UEFA Champions League were held away from Israel, leading Maccabi to be ousted from both the Champions League and the Europa League. There was also a change in club manager following Paulo Sousa's appointment at FC Basel. Oscar Garcia briefly returned but left before the beginning of the season when Cruyff appointed Pako Ayestarán, former assistant to Rafael Benítez at Liverpool. Maccabi Tel Aviv became the first Israeli team to win all three local trophies: the Israeli Premier League, the Israel State Cup and the Toto Cup.

In April 2015, Cruyff renewed his contract for a further two years despite interest from English Championship and Bundesliga sides.

In the 2015–16 season, Cruyff appointed Slaviša Jokanović as head coach after the Serbian had promoted Watford to the Premier League. The team qualified for the UEFA Champions League group stages for the first time in 11 years, playing against Chelsea, Porto and Dynamo Kyiv in Group G before exiting the competition. Cruyff appointed Vitesse's Peter Bosz after Jokanovic signed as the new Fulham's head coach at the end of December.

Managerial career
In his first full season as head coach in season 2017–18, Cruyff led Maccabi Tel Aviv to Toto Cup glory, oversaw a second-place league finish and secured European qualification for a sixth successive year since he joined the club in 2012. At the start of that campaign, he successfully guided the team through four qualifying rounds to reach the UEFA Europa League group stage. At the end of the season, he announced his intention to leave the club to begin new experiences.

On 8 August 2018, Cruyff was appointed as the manager of Chinese Super League side Chongqing Dangdai Lifan. In 2019, he led the club to their best start in Super League history but decided to not renew his contract, and left the club at the end of the season.

On 3 January 2020, Cruyff reached an agreement to become manager of the Ecuador national football team.
On 23 July 2020 Cruyff resigned from his position. This came after several major leadership changes in the Ecuadorian Football Federation. Ecuador did not play any matches or hold any training camps in his time as head coach, due to the COVID-19 pandemic.

On 14 August 2020, Cruyff was appointed as the manager of Chinese Super League club Shenzhen FC.

On 2 June 2021, Barcelona announced his appointment on the role of sporting advisor.

Career statistics

Club

International

 Scores and results list the Netherlands' goal tally first, score column indicates score after each Cruyff goal.

Managerial statistics

Honours

Player
Barcelona
Supercopa de España: 1994

Manchester United
Premier League: 1996–97
FA Charity Shield: 1996, 1997

Manager
Maccabi Tel Aviv
Toto Cup: 2017–18

Sources
Barça: A People's Passion (1998), Jimmy Burns.

References

External links

 
 
 
 SportingHeroes profile
  
 
 
 

Jordi
1974 births
Living people
Footballers from Amsterdam
Dutch footballers
Footballers from Catalonia
Association football midfielders
FC Barcelona Atlètic players
FC Barcelona players
Manchester United F.C. players
RC Celta de Vigo players
Deportivo Alavés players
RCD Espanyol footballers
FC Metalurh Donetsk players
Valletta F.C. players
La Liga players
Premier League players
Ukrainian Premier League players
Maltese Premier League players
Netherlands international footballers
Catalonia international footballers
UEFA Euro 1996 players
Dutch expatriate footballers
Dutch expatriate sportspeople in Spain
Dutch expatriate sportspeople in England
Dutch expatriate sportspeople in Ukraine
Dutch expatriate sportspeople in Malta
Expatriate footballers in Spain
Expatriate footballers in England
Expatriate footballers in Ukraine
Expatriate footballers in Malta
Dutch football managers
Maccabi Tel Aviv F.C. managers
Chongqing Liangjiang Athletic F.C. managers
Ecuador national football team managers
Israeli Premier League managers
Chinese Super League managers
Dutch expatriate football managers
Dutch expatriate sportspeople in Cyprus
Dutch expatriate sportspeople in Israel
Dutch expatriate sportspeople in China
Dutch expatriate sportspeople in Ecuador
Expatriate football managers in Israel
Expatriate football managers in China
Expatriate football managers in Ecuador